Parul Dalsukhbhai Parmar (born 20 March 1973) is an Indian para-badminton player from Gujarat. She had been ranked world number one in para-badminton women's singles SL3.

Early life 
Parmar was born in Gandhinagar, Gujarat. She was diagnosed with Poliomyelitis when she was three years old and in the same year she fell from a swing while playing, resulting in a fractured collar bone and right leg. The injury took a long time to heal. Her father was a state-level badminton player and would go to a local badminton club to practice. She also started going to the club with her father and started developing interest in the game. She also began playing badminton with neighbor kids. A local coach, Surendra Parekh, noticed her talent in the sport and encouraged her to play more seriously.

Career
She won the golds in women's singles and doubles at the 2017 BWF Para-Badminton World Championships. She defeated Wandee Kamtam of Thailand in singles' final. Along with Japan's Akiko Sugino, she defeated China's Cheng Hefang and Ma Huihui in doubles' final.

She has won golds in women's single SL3 at the 2014 and 2018 Asian Para Games. She also won gold in women’s singles SL3 category, at the 2018 Thailand Para-Badminton International. She had previously won the silver in 2014 Asian Para Games and the bronze in 2010 Asian Para Games. She also won the gold in the mixed doubles in SL3-SU5 category with Raj Kumar at the 2015 BWF Para-Badminton World Championships.

She is a three time world champion and she won gold and silver medals in 2014, Asian Para Games in Incheon, South Korea. She played against Wandee Kamtam and Panyachaem Paramee, both hailing from Thailand, to win the medals. She also won two golds in women's singles and doubles. She paired with Japan's Akiko Sugino in doubles to defeat the Chinese duo of Cheng Hefang and Ma Huihui in the 2017 BWF Para-Badminton World Championships held in Ulsan, Korea in 2017.

She works as a coach with the Sports Authority of India and lives in Gandhinagar, Gujarat.

Awards
Parmar was awarded the Arjuna Award in 2009 by the Government of India and Eklavya Award by the Government of Gujarat.

Achievements

World Championships 

Women's singles

Women's doubles

Mixed doubles

IWAS World Games 
Women's singles

Mixed doubles

Asian Para Games 

Women's singles

Mixed doubles

Asian Championships 
Women's singles

Women's doubles

BWF Para Badminton World Circuit (2 titles, 3 runners-up) 
The BWF Para Badminton World Circuit – Grade 2, Level 1, 2 and 3 tournaments has been sanctioned by the Badminton World Federation from 2022.

Men's singles

Men's doubles

Mixed doubles

International Tournaments (13 titles, 7 runners-up) 
Women's singles

Women's doubles

Mixed doubles

References

External links

Notes

1973 births
Living people
Indian female badminton players
Indian female para-badminton players
Paralympic badminton players of India
Badminton players at the 2020 Summer Paralympics
Recipients of the Arjuna Award
People with polio
People from Gandhinagar
Racket sportspeople from Gujarat
Sportswomen from Gujarat
20th-century Indian women
21st-century Indian women